Cabo San Antonio is Spanish for "Cape San Antonio", and may refer to:

Places
Cape San Antonio, Argentina
Cape San Antonio, Cuba
Cape San Antonio, Spain

Ships
ARA Cabo San Antonio (Q-42), an Argentine Navy tank landing ship decommissioned in 1997